Giovanni Garzia Mellini (his first name is also rendered Giangarzia while his middle name is also rendered Garsia) (1562 – 2 October 1629) was a Roman Catholic prelate who served as Cardinal-Bishop of Frascati (1629), Cardinal-Priest of San Lorenzo in Lucina (1627–1629), Camerlengo of the Sacred College of Cardinals (1623–1625), Archpriest of the Basilica di Santa Maria Maggiore (1622–1629), Cardinal-Priest of Santi Quattro Coronati (1608–1627), Archbishop (Personal Title) of Imola (1607–1611), and Apostolic Nuncio to Spain (1605–1607).

Biography
Giovanni Garzia Mellini was born to a noble Roman family in Florence, Italy in 1562, the son of Mario Millini and Ortensia Jacovacci. He comes from a family of cardinals who served both before and after him: Giovanni Battista Mellini (installed 1476); his uncle, Giambattista Castagna (later Pope Urban VII) (installed 1583); Savo Millini (installed 1681); and Mario Millini (installed 1747). He studied law under his uncle, Giambattista Castagna.

From 1585 to 1590, he served as consistorial lawyer for Pope Sixtus V. In 1591, he was appointed as Auditor of the Sacred Roman Rota. During the papacy of Pope Clement VIII, he went to France with Cardinal Pietro Aldobrandini to negotiate the marriage of Marie de' Medici to King Henri IV. On June 1, 1605, he was named Titular Archbishop of Colossae by Pope Leo XI and consecrated bishop on 12 June 1605 by Ludovico de Torres (cardinal), Archbishop of Monreale, with Valeriano Muti, Bishop of Città di Castello, and Gaspare Paluzzi degli Albertoni, Bishop of Sant'Angelo dei Lombardi e Bisaccia, serving as co-consecrators. On June 20, 1605 he was appointed as Apostolic Nuncio to Spain where he served until May 22, 1607. On September 11, 1606, he was elevated to cardinal by Pope Paul V and appointed Bishop of Imola on 7 February 1607. On 7 January 1608, he received the title of Cardinal-Priest of Santi Quattro Coronati. On 27 June 1611, he resigned as Bishop of Imola. He served as Vicar general of Rome (1610-1629) and Secretary of the Supreme Sacred Congregation of the Roman and Universal Inquisition (1616-1629).

While cardinal, he participated in the conclave of 1621 which elected Pope Gregory XV; and the conclave of 1623 which elected Pope Urban VIII. In 1622, he was appointed the Archpriest of the Basilica di Santa Maria Maggiore. On August 6, 1623, he was elected as Camerlengo of the Sacred College of Cardinals and reelected on January 15, 1624; he served until January 13, 1625. On 14 April 1627, he received the title of Cardinal-Priest of San Lorenzo in Lucina and Archpriest of the patriarchal Liberian basilica. On 20 August 1629, he was named Cardinal-Bishop of Frascati, a title he held until his death on October 2, 1629 in Rome. He is buried in the church of Santa Maria del Popolo.

Episcopal succession

References 

17th-century Italian Roman Catholic titular archbishops
Bishops appointed by Pope Leo XI
1562 births
1629 deaths
Apostolic Nuncios to Spain